Miloš Koterec (born 11 October 1962, in Partizánske) is a career diplomat from Slovakia. He was sent to the Permanent Mission of Slovakia to the U.N. from '95–'99. He then went on to work at the Permanent Mission to NATO for Slovakia in 2001. In 2005 he was elected as an MEP for Slovakia.

In 2009 he was appointed as the Permanent Representative to the U.N. for Slovakia.

He has received the Gold Polish Army Medal in 2012.

See also 
List of Permanent Representatives to the United Nations
Miloš Koterec is now serving as president of the economic and social council of the United nations, he became president on the tenth of January 2012 after serving as senior Vice-president of the council in 2011.

References

External links 
 Biography at osobnosti.sk 

1962 births
Living people
People from Partizánske
Direction – Social Democracy politicians
Direction – Social Democracy MEPs
MEPs for Slovakia 2004–2009
Permanent Representatives of Slovakia to the United Nations
Recipients of the Polish Army Medal